"Mesosuchia" is an obsolete name for a group of terrestrial, semi-aquatic, or fully aquatic crocodylomorph reptiles. The marine crocodile Metriorhynchus had paddle-like forelimbs, Dakosaurus andiniensis had a skull that was adapted to eat large sea reptiles, and Shamosuchus was adapted for eating molluscs and gastropods. Shamosuchus also looked like modern crocodiles and was very closely related to their direct ancestor.

The "Mesosuchia" were formerly placed at Suborder rank as within Crocodylia. The "first" crocodiles were placed within their own suborder, Protosuchia; whilst extant species where placed within Suborder Eusuchia (meaning 'true crocodiles'). Mesosuchia were the crocodylians "in between".But it is no longer regarded as genuine because it belongs to a paraphyletic group. It is replaced by its phylogenetic equivalent Mesoeucrocodylia, which contains the taxa herein, the Crocodylia, and some allied forms more recently discovered.

The "Mesosuchia" was composed as:
 Family Hsisosuchidae
 Family Gobiosuchidae
 Infraorder Notosuchia
 Family Notosuchidae
 Family Sebecidae
 Family Baurusuchidae
 Infraorder Neosuchia
 Family Trematochampsidae
 Family Peirosauridae
 Genus Lomasuchus
 Genus Montealtosuchus
Family Elosuchidae
 Family Atoposauridae
 Family Dyrosauridae
 Family Pholidosauridae
 Genus Sarcosuchus
 Infraorder Thalattosuchia - Sea "Crocodiles"
 Family Teleosauridae
 Family Metriorhynchidae
Genus Dakosaurus
 Family Goniopholididae
 Family Paralligatoridae
 Genus Shamosuchus

External links
A teleosaurid (Crocodylia, Mesosuchia) from the Toarcian of Madagascar and its palaeobiogeographical significance
Blue Nile Gorge
Crocodyliformes

Crocodyliforms
Jurassic crocodylomorphs
Cretaceous crocodylomorphs
Paleocene crocodylomorphs
Eocene crocodylomorphs
Hettangian first appearances
Eocene extinctions
Paraphyletic groups